Davide Pascolo (born 14 December 1990) is an Italian professional basketball player for Assigeco Piacenza of the Italian Serie A2, second tier national league, on a loan contract from Aquila Basket Trento. At a height of 2.03 m (6'8") tall, his primary position is power forward, but he can also be used as a small ball center, if needed.

Professional career
Pascolo began his professional career with his home town team of Snaidero Cucine Udine, in the Italian First Division, in the 2008–09 season. Pascolo initially struggled to become a regular rotation player in the team. That continued even after the club was relegated to the Italian Second Division, where Pascolo played with the team for the 2009–10 and 2010–11 seasons.

Pascolo then left Udine, and he then joined Aquila Basket Trento, which was playing in the Italian 3rd Division, for the 2011–12 season. That proved to be a wise move for Pasdcolo, as the club moved up in the ranks of the Italian basketball league system. They achieved that by first gaining a promotion to the Italian 2nd Division, where they also won the Italian 2nd-tier national cup, in 2012–13; and by then gaining a promotion to the top-tier level Italian league, the LBA, after the 2013–14 season, in which Pascolo was named the league MVP of the Italian 2nd-tier level. He was named to the European 2nd-tier level EuroCup's All-EuroCup First Team, for the 2015–16 season.

On 17 June 2016 Pascolo signed a multi-year deal with the Italian club Olimpia Milano.

On 1 July 2018 Pascolo left Olimpia Milano after 2 seasons, where he won one Supercup, one Italian Cup and one Scudetto.

On 24 July 2018 Pascolo officially announced the return to Aquila Basket Trento with a three-year deal. On 17 June 2020 he extended his contract until 2023.

On 29 September 2021 he played for the 2021–2022 season with Assigeco Piacenza in the Serie A2 second tier national league, on a loan contract basis.

International career
Pascolo was called up to the senior men's Italian national basketball team in 2014, and he played a marginal part in the team's EuroBasket 2015 qualification tournament, in which they qualified for the actual main tournament, the EuroBasket 2015.

References

External links
 Euroleague.net Profile
 Eurobasket.com Profile
 FIBA Archive Profile
 FIBA Game-Center Profile
 Legabasket.it Profile 

1990 births
Living people
Aquila Basket Trento players
Centers (basketball)
Italian men's basketball players
Lega Basket Serie A players
Olimpia Milano players
Pallalcesto Amatori Udine players
Power forwards (basketball)